Emmanuel Martínez (born March 23, 1989 in San Martin, Buenos Aires, Argentina) is an Argentine football right back who currently plays for Los Andes of the Primera B Metropolitana.

Career

Italy
Martínez moved to Italy in the summer 2018 and joined Molfetta Sportiva. In the beginning of 2019, he joined Vigor Trani Calcio, before joining Ugento Calcio in August 2019.

References

External links
 Emmanuel Martínez at Soccerway

1989 births
Living people
Footballers from Buenos Aires
Argentine footballers
Argentine expatriate footballers
Club Atlético River Plate footballers
PFC Pirin Blagoevgrad players
Ferro Carril Oeste footballers
Quilmes Atlético Club footballers
Deportivo Merlo footballers
Olimpo footballers
Club Atlético Los Andes footballers
Juventud Unida de Gualeguaychú players
Barracas Central players
Argentine Primera División players
Primera Nacional players
Primera B Metropolitana players
First Professional Football League (Bulgaria) players
Association football defenders
Expatriate footballers in Bulgaria
Expatriate footballers in Italy
Argentine expatriate sportspeople in Bulgaria
Argentine expatriate sportspeople in Italy